The Samsung Galaxy Beam i8530 (also known as the Galaxy Beam) is a projector-enabled smartphone produced by Samsung.

In February 2012 the i8530 Galaxy Beam was presented at the Mobile World Congress in Barcelona. An update to the newer version of Android Jelly Bean is planned.

See also
Handheld projector
Projector phone

Notes

External links
 Full specifications: http://www.gsmarena.com/samsung_i8530_galaxy_beam-4566.php
 Official Website (Galaxy Beam) http://www.samsung.com/global/microsite/galaxybeam

Android (operating system) devices
Samsung smartphones
Samsung Galaxy
Mobile phones introduced in 2012